Robert Laurence Mills (April 15, 1927 – October 27, 1999)  was an American physicist, specializing in quantum field theory, the theory of alloys, and many-body theory.  While sharing an office at Brookhaven National Laboratory, Chen-Ning Yang and Robert Mills formulated in 1954 a theory now known as the Yang–Mills theory – "the foundation for current understanding of how subatomic particles interact, a contribution which has restructured modern physics and mathematics."

Mathematically, Yang and Mills proposed a tensor equation for what are now called Yang–Mills fields (this equation reduces to Maxwell's equations as a special case; see gauge theory):
 .

Biography 
Mills was born in Englewood, New Jersey, son of Dorothy C. and Frederick C. Mills. He graduated from George School in Pennsylvania in early 1944. He studied at Columbia College from 1944 to 1948, while on leave from the Coast Guard.  Mills demonstrated his mathematical ability by becoming a Putnam Fellow in 1948, and by receiving first-class honors in the Tripos. Mills, who was still a novice theoretical physicist, met Yang and assisted him in polishing Yang's hypothesis on non-abelian gauge fields, which later became the Yang-Mills Theory and consequently the heart of modern physics.

The mathematical ability he displayed early on was mastered in his eventual career as a full-time theoretical physicist. He earned a master's degree from Cambridge, and a PhD in Physics under Norman Kroll, from Columbia University in 1955. After a year at the Institute for Advanced Study in Princeton, New Jersey, Mills became Professor of Physics at Ohio State University in 1956. He remained at Ohio State University until his retirement in 1995.

Mills and Yang shared the 1980 Rumford Premium Prize from the American Academy of Arts and Sciences for their "development of a generalized gauge invariant field theory" in 1954.

Personal life 
Mills was married to Elise Ackley in 1948. Together they had sons Edward and Jonathan, and daughters Katherine, Susan, and Dorothy. The Mills family lived for many years in Columbus, Ohio during Mills' tenure as professor at Ohio State University. He was an elder of Indianola Presbyterian Church and active in the international student community in Columbus. 
The family also spent considerable time during the summer and winter breaks at their property on Echo Lake in Charleston, Vermont, where Robert spent his final months.

Selected publications 
 Yang–Mills theory

References

Citations

Sources

External links 

 

1927 births
1999 deaths
20th-century American physicists
Columbia College (New York) alumni
Ohio State University faculty
Columbia Graduate School of Arts and Sciences alumni
Putnam Fellows
Brookhaven National Laboratory staff
Theoretical physicists
People from Columbus, Ohio
People from Englewood, New Jersey
George School alumni